The Whitefish Lake First Nation is a First Nations band government in northern Alberta. Headquartered in Atikameg, it controls three Indian reserves, Utikoomak Lake 155, Utikoomak Lake 155A, and Utikoomak Lake 155B.

References

First Nations governments in Alberta
Cree governments